North Rockhampton State High School is a co-educational State High School at Beserker Street, Frenchville, Rockhampton, Queensland, Australia. It currently has over 1000 students enrolled and over 80 teaching staff. North Rockhampton High School is currently an academy of excellence in hockey.

To its members, the school is commonly referred to as 'North Rocky'.

History

North Rockhampton State High School was founded in 1956, initially renting rooms from two churches and a nearby business when the school buildings were not completed in time for the start of the school year. In its early days, the school was the largest school in Queensland at the time, with over 1500 students.

House structure

North Rockhampton High School has four houses.

Berserker House. Mascot – Berserker Warrior. Colour – Blue.
Fitzroy House. Mascot – Fitzroy Falcon. Colour – Green.
Keppel House. Mascot – Keppel Cobra. Colour – Yellow.
Archer House. Archer Pegasus. Colour – Red

Sports

Every year, North Rocky High holds Interhouse Athletics and Swimming Carnivals. Before Easter, the school holds an Interhouse Cross-Country day at Kemp Beach on the Capricorn Coast.

Notable alumni

North Rockhampton High School was the high school of Olympic gold medallist hockey players, Mark Knowles and Jamie Dwyer.

Steve Baxter, Australian entrepreneur, known for his work at PIPE Networks, StartupAUS and River City Labs, is now a 'shark' on Network Ten reality television series, Shark Tank, which is based on the international Dragons' Den format.

Craig Zonca, Australian radio broadcaster, was presenter of ABC Local Radio's long-running rural affairs program, The Queensland Country Hour from 2013 until 2016. In December 2016, he was announced as Spencer Howson's replacement as breakfast presenter on 612 ABC Brisbane.

Beres Joyner was appointed "staff specialist" in 2012, by Queensland Health. There are only 27 such positions in Queensland. This comes after years working in a wide variety of medical practice areas, including indigenous health.

References

Public high schools in Queensland
Educational institutions established in 1956
Schools in Rockhampton
1956 establishments in Australia